Serlo II (also Sarlo, Serlone in Italian and Serlon in French : after 1027/35 – 1072), son and namesake of Serlo of Hauteville and grandson of Tancred of Hauteville, went to seek his fortunes in the Mezzogiorno along with his numerous uncles and cousins, following Roger around 1056, for he is found in Calabria in 1060.

He joined Roger's expedition to Sicily in 1060 and, the next year, he routed the Saracens at Cape Farò, preventing their retreat to Messina. This expedition ended, however, in failure. Serlo accompanied Roger on his 1065 expedition as well, and there he was one of the commanders, being given charge of holding the town of Cerami when the Saracens surprised them there. He was holding off reinforcements from the central stronghold of Enna when, in 1071, Palermo itself fell. In 1072, he and his small band of followers were ambushed near Nicosia by a large Saracen army. They managed to climb to the flat top of a large rock, where they fought to the last man. The rock was commemorated with a large carving of a cross and was remembered as the Pietra di Serlone, "Serlo's Rock", until it was demolished in the 1960s by a construction firm.

He was made lord of Gerace, Serrata, Surito, and Cerami soon before his death, but he never took up control of his fiefs. He was married to Altruda, daughter of Rudolf, count of Boiano, and had two children: Serlo III and Eliusa. His widow remarried to Ingelmarius.

Notes

References

External links
 Le origine della “Rocca di Sarro” (Serlo's Rock)

Italo-Normans
Norman warriors
11th-century births
1072 deaths
Nicosia, Sicily